Daishi (written: 大志 or 大士) is a masculine Japanese given name. Notable people with the name include:

Daishi Dance (born 1976), Japanese DJ and record producer
, Japanese footballer
, Japanese footballer
, Japanese rugby union player

Daishi (written: 大至) is also a Japanese surname. Notable people with the surname include:

, Japanese sumo wrestler

See also
21014 Daishi, a main-belt asteroid

Japanese masculine given names